The Runestone Community Center is a multi purpose ice arena and recreational facility located in Alexandria, Minnesota. The ice arena serves as the home to the Alexandria Blizzard of the North American 3 Hockey League. The facility is also home to several local high school ice hockey teams, local figure skating clubs, youth, and adult recreational ice hockey leagues, as well as public skating.

References

External links
Official site
Alexandria Blizzard

Indoor arenas in Minnesota
Indoor ice hockey venues in Minnesota
Sports venues in Minnesota
Buildings and structures in Douglas County, Minnesota